Rodrigo Follé Ferrazzo (born February 24, 1984), commonly known as Follé, is a Brazilian former professional footballer who played as a defender.

Follé became a naturalized Mexican citizen before re-joining Leones Negros for the 2014-15 Liga MX.

References

External links

Living people
1984 births
Brazilian people of Italian descent
Brazilian footballers
Association football defenders
Liga MX players
Leones Negros UdeG footballers
Lobos BUAP footballers
Correcaminos UAT footballers